In the mathematical field of knot theory, a knot invariant is a quantity (in a broad sense) defined for each knot which is the same for equivalent knots. The equivalence is often given by ambient isotopy but can be given by homeomorphism. Research on invariants is not only motivated by the basic problem of distinguishing one knot from another but also to understand fundamental properties of knots and their relations to other branches of mathematics. Knot invariants are thus used in knot classification, both in "enumeration" and "duplication removal".

From the modern perspective, it is natural to define a knot invariant from a knot diagram. Of course, it must be unchanged (that is to say, invariant) under the Reidemeister moves ("triangular moves"). Tricolorability (and n-colorability) is a particularly simple and common example. Other examples are knot polynomials, such as the Jones polynomial, which are currently among the most useful invariants for distinguishing knots from one another, though currently it is not known whether there exists a knot polynomial which distinguishes all knots from each other. However, there are invariants which distinguish the unknot from all other knots, such as Khovanov homology and knot Floer homology.

Other invariants can be defined by considering some integer-valued function of knot diagrams and taking its minimum value over all possible diagrams of a given knot. This category includes the crossing number, which is the minimum number of crossings for any diagram of the knot, and the bridge number, which is the minimum number of bridges for any diagram of the knot.

Historically, many of the early knot invariants are not defined by first selecting a diagram but defined intrinsically, which can make computing some of these invariants a challenge. For example, knot genus is particularly tricky to compute, but can be effective (for instance, in distinguishing mutants).

The complement of a knot itself (as a topological space) is known to be a "complete invariant" of the knot by the Gordon–Luecke theorem in the sense that it distinguishes the given knot from all other knots up to ambient isotopy and mirror image. Some invariants associated with the knot complement include the knot group which is just the fundamental group of the complement. The knot quandle is also a complete invariant in this sense but it is difficult to determine if two quandles are isomorphic. The peripheral subgroup can also work as a complete invariant.

By Mostow–Prasad rigidity, the hyperbolic structure on the complement of a hyperbolic link is unique, which means the hyperbolic volume is an invariant for these knots and links. Volume, and other hyperbolic invariants, have proven very effective, utilized in some of the extensive efforts at knot tabulation.

In recent years, there has been much interest in homological invariants of knots which categorify well-known invariants. Heegaard Floer homology is a homology theory whose Euler characteristic is the Alexander polynomial of the knot. It has been proven effective in deducing new results about the classical invariants. Along a different line of study, there is a combinatorially defined cohomology theory of knots called Khovanov homology whose Euler characteristic is the Jones polynomial. This has recently been shown to be useful in obtaining bounds on slice genus whose earlier proofs required gauge theory. Mikhail Khovanov and Lev Rozansky have since defined several other related cohomology theories whose Euler characteristics recover other classical invariants. Catharina Stroppel gave a representation theoretic interpretation of Khovanov homology by categorifying quantum group invariants.

There is also growing interest from both knot theorists and scientists in understanding "physical" or geometric properties of knots and relating it to topological invariants and knot type. An old result in this direction is the Fáry–Milnor theorem states that if the total curvature of a knot  in  satisfies

Therefore, for knotted curves,

An example of a "physical" invariant is ropelength, which is the length of unit-diameter rope needed to realize a particular knot type.

Other invariants
 
  (or Vassiliev or Vassiliev–Goussarov invariant)

Sources

Further reading

External links